Markus Rupp from the Technical University Vienna, Wien, Austria was named Fellow of the Institute of Electrical and Electronics Engineers (IEEE) in 2015 for contributions to adaptive filters and communication technologies.

References 

Fellow Members of the IEEE
Living people
Year of birth missing (living people)